Kosyakino is a rural locality (a selo) and the administrative centre of Kosyakinsky Selsoviet, Kizlyarsky District, Republic of Dagestan, Russia. The population was 1,445 as of 2010. There are 14 streets.

Geography 
Kosyakino is located 8 km northwest of Kizlyar (the district's administrative centre) by road. Vperyod and Pervomayskoye are the nearest rural localities.

Nationalities 
Avars, Dargins, Russians, Laks, Kumyks, Azerbaijanis and Lezgins live there.

References 

Rural localities in Kizlyarsky District